Felipe Garcia dos Prazeres (born 10 January 1988), simply known as Felipe Garcia, is a Brazilian footballer who plays for Tombense as a goalkeeper.

Club career
Born in São Vicente, São Paulo, Felipe graduated from Santos's prolific youth setup, and was promoted to the main squad in 2006, initially as a third-choice. On 6 September 2006 he made his first team debut, starting in a 1–0 home win against Cruzeiro, for that year's Copa Sudamericana.

Felipe made his Série A debut four days later, playing the full 90 minutes in a 1–1 away draw against Fortaleza. On 5 October, in a derby against Corinthians, he replaced Fábio Costa in the sixth minute of the match, after the latter suffered an injury, and was a key unit in his side's 3–0 away win.

Felipe was included in Brazil's preliminary squad for the Beijing Summer Olympics, but was eventually not included in the final list for that competition by coach Dunga.

Still as a second-choice in the following campaigns, Felipe was loaned to Paraná and subsequently Portuguesa Santista before returning to Peixe in May 2009, after another injury from Fábio Costa. He was made a starter for the rest of the season, appearing in 24 league matches.

Felipe started 2010 as a first-choice, but subsequently lost his spot to another youth graduate, Rafael. After an altercation with supporters through a social media, he was left out of the squad, and loaned to Avaí and Náutico, respectively.

On 3 January 2013 Felipe joined Timbu permanently, signing a two-year deal. On 1 October he left the club, and moved to Fluminense.

After being mainly a backup to Diego Cavalieri, Felipe was released in December 2014. On 6 May, of the following year he signed for Portuguesa, in Série C.

Career statistics

Honours

Club
Santos
Campeonato Paulista Sub-17: 2004
Campeonato Paulista: 2006, 2007, 2010
Copa do Brasil: 2010

Atlético Goianiense
Campeonato Brasileiro Série B: 2016

International
Brazil U17
South American Under-17 Football Championship: 2005

References

External links

1988 births
Living people
People from São Vicente, São Paulo
Brazilian footballers
Association football goalkeepers
Campeonato Brasileiro Série A players
Campeonato Brasileiro Série B players
Campeonato Brasileiro Série C players
Santos FC players
Paraná Clube players
Associação Atlética Portuguesa (Santos) players
Avaí FC players
Clube Náutico Capibaribe players
Fluminense FC players
Associação Portuguesa de Desportos players
Anápolis Futebol Clube players
Atlético Clube Goianiense players
Moreirense F.C. players
Centro Sportivo Alagoano players
Tombense Futebol Clube players
Sport Club do Recife players
Brazil youth international footballers
Brazil under-20 international footballers
Brazilian expatriate footballers
Brazilian expatriate sportspeople in Portugal
Expatriate footballers in Portugal
Footballers from São Paulo (state)
21st-century Brazilian people